|}

The Orby Stakes is a Listed flat horse race in Ireland open to thoroughbreds aged three years or older. It is run over a distance of 1 mile and 2 furlongs (2,012 metres) at the Curragh in June.

The race was first run in 1991 as the Hotel Conrad Silver Race.  The race was run at Leopardstown in 2004 and 2005. The title was changed to the Orby Stakes from the 2021 running and commemorates Orby, the first Irish-trained horse to win the Epsom Derby.

Records

Leading jockey (5 wins):
Kevin Manning  – Ballykett Nancy (1994), Identify (1996), Carraiglawn (2010), Trading Leather (2013), Glamorous Approach (2017)

Leading trainer (7 wins):
Jim Bolger – Ballykett Nancy (1994), Identify (1996), Heliostatic (2006), Carraiglawn (2010), Trading Leather (2013), Glamorous Approach (2017), Guaranteed (2019)

Winners

See also
 Horse racing in Ireland
 List of Irish flat horse races

References
Racing Post:
, 

Open middle distance horse races
Curragh Racecourse
Flat races in Ireland
1991 establishments in Ireland
Recurring sporting events established in 1991